Pamela Rose (29 November 1917 – 17 October 2021) was an actress (as Pamela Gibson) who later worked at Bletchley Park running Naval Hut 4’s indexing section. In later life she was a trustee and chair of charities.

Education and personal life
Susan Pamela Gibson was born during a zeppelin raid on 29 November 1917 in Knightsbridge, London, a daughter of Thornely and Elizabeth (nee Wetzlar) Gibson. Her father was a stockbroker but had been an opera singer in his earlier life. She had an elder brother, Patrick. The family held monthly soirees, so she grew up in a house of musical performance. She attended Broadstairs Preparatory School and then Westonbirt School in Gloucestershire. At her parents' request, she became a debutante for part of a season after leaving school. This was with the express purpose to find her a husband. However, she didn't want a husband at this point, as she wanted to act, so she went to France and studied French and cabaret performance with Yvette Guilbert. Following this she went to Munich, Germany and learnt German. She returned to the UK and trained at the Webber Douglas School of Singing and Dramatic Art in London.

She met her future husband, Jim Rose, during amateur dramatics at Bletchley Park when they both worked there during the Second World War. They married in January 1946. They had two children. The family moved to Switzerland for most of the 1950s because of his work.

She was the guest on an episode of BBC Radio 4 Desert Island Discs in 2015. She died 17 October 2021.

Career
Having completed stage school she began a career as an actress in the late 1930s. She played one of the lead roles in Synge's The Playboy of the Western World opposite Cyril Cusack at the Mercury Theatre, London.

When the Second World War started, she joined the Entertainments National Service Association and was in productions in Bournemouth and Birmingham and by 1942 was about to take a leading role at the Aldwych theatre. At this point, because of her language skills and family background, she was invited to an interview with Frank Birch, an ex-actor who was in charge of Hut 4 in the Naval section at Bletchley Park. She was offered a post at Bletchley Park and worked there for the rest of the Second World War.

Her knowledge of German led to her being employed in the section that entered keywords from decrypted messages onto index cards so that the information could be searched as effectively as possible.  Others with whom she worked and socialised while working at Bletchley included Sarah Baring and Jean Barker, Baroness Trumpington. She was soon in charge of this index that eventually expanded to occupy 3 rooms. Gibson rose to be in charge of all the Naval Sections records and thus one of the most senior women at Bletchley Park. In the late 1990s she contributed information to a television series about the work at Bletchley Park.

After she and her husband returned from Switzerland, he was not keen for her to return to the stage as their working hours would mean they would never see each other. Instead she taught at a local comprehensive school that supported newly arrived Caribbean children from the Windrush generation. She declared that this was more important than any of her work at Bletchley Park.

From the early 1960s she became a counsellor in a London school until retiring around 1979. In the 1980s she became a trustee of the National Society for the Prevention of Cruelty to Children and in the 1990s became chair of the Stroke Association.

After her husband's death in 1999, an actor friend, Sam Beazley, persuaded her to take classes at The Actors Centre in Covent Garden, and despite being away from the stage for almost 60 years, she soon picked up the skills again.

In 2002 she returned to the stage in Oscar Wilde's Lady Windermere's Fan alongside Vanessa Redgrave. This was directed by Peter Hall at the Theatre Royal, Bath. She continued acting until her 90's, when her eyesight began fading.

References

1917 births
2021 deaths
British centenarians
Bletchley Park people
Bletchley Park women
British actresses
People educated at Westonbirt School
British debutantes
People from Knightsbridge